Benoît Delépine (born 30 August 1958) is a French comedian and film director. He is known for his satirical activities on TV channel Canal+.

Director of the TV program Guignols de l'info for many years, he currently writes TV programs about the fictional country of Groland. He also plays the cynical journalist-reporter Mickael Kael.

In the cinema, Delépine has written and performed in two films. Mickael Kael contre la World News Company, a chess commercial, reprising two elements of the fictional career of the director: his role as a reporter for Groland and the World Company, which he contributed to create for Les Guignols.

In 2004, Aaltra, which he wrote, directed, and starred in with Gustave Kervern enjoyed critical success. The two companions from the Groland adventure wrote and directed it as a road movie where two enemies travel the roads of northern France and Finland following an accident. With Kervern, he also directed and starred in Avida, which was awarded screened out of competition at the 2006 Cannes Film Festival. His 2010 film Mammuth was nominated for the Golden Bear at the 60th Berlin International Film Festival.

His 2012 film Le grand soir competed in the Un Certain Regard section at the 2012 Cannes Film Festival where it won the Special Jury Prize.

Filmography

As filmmaker

References

External links

 
 Entretien avec B. Delépine pour l'œil électrique, peu après la sortie du film Mickael Kael contre la World News Company (French)

1958 births
Living people
French film directors
French male film actors
French comedians
French male screenwriters
French screenwriters
French film producers
People from Saint-Quentin, Aisne
French humorists